The 1989 CFL season is considered to be the 36th season in modern-day Canadian football, although it is officially the 32nd Canadian Football League season.

CFL News in 1989

The CFL Board of Governors approved the sale of the Hamilton Tiger-Cats from Harold Ballard (of Maple Leaf Gardens Limited) to David Braley on Friday, February 24. In April, the CFL announced a two-year television agreement with Carling O'Keefe Breweries for $12 million plus an additional $3 million for club promotional support.

The CFL hosted both its Annual Meetings and the Canadian College Draft for the second straight year in Hamilton.

The Toronto Argonauts played their first game at the SkyDome. The SkyDome also was the host of the 77th Annual Grey Cup game, on Sunday, November 26, when the Saskatchewan Roughriders defeated the Hamilton Tiger-Cats 43–40.

On September 7, the BC Lions were purchased by Murray Pezim.

The Canadian Interuniversity Athletic Union decided to change the location of the Vanier Cup game, from Varsity Stadium to the SkyDome. The University of Western Ontario defeated the University of Saskatchewan, 35–10 in the Vanier Cup's silver anniversary game.

On Sunday, December 31, Bill Baker decided to resign as the President and Chief Operating Officer of the CFL.

Regular season standings

Final regular season standings
Note: GP = Games Played, W = Wins, L = Losses, T = Ties, PF = Points For, PA = Points Against, Pts = Points

Bold text means that they have clinched the playoffs.
Edmonton and Hamilton have first round byes.

Grey Cup playoffs

The Saskatchewan Roughriders are the 1989 Grey Cup champions, defeating the Hamilton Tiger-Cats 43–40, at Toronto's SkyDome.  This was Saskatchewan's first championship since 1966. The Roughriders' Kent Austin (QB) was named the Grey Cup's Most Valuable Player on Offence and Chuck Klingbeil (DT) was named Grey Cup's Most Valuable Player on Defence, while Dave Ridgway (K) was named the Grey Cup's Most Valuable Canadian.

Playoff bracket

CFL Leaders
 CFL Passing Leaders
 CFL Rushing Leaders
 CFL Receiving Leaders

1989 CFL All-Stars

Offence
QB – Tracy Ham, Edmonton Eskimos
RB – Tim McCray, Saskatchewan Roughriders
RB – Reggie Taylor, Edmonton Eskimos
SB – Rocky DiPietro, Hamilton Tiger-Cats
SB – Craig Ellis, Edmonton Eskimos
WR – Tony Champion, Hamilton Tiger-Cats
WR – Don Narcisse, Saskatchewan Roughriders
C – Rod Connop, Edmonton Eskimos
OG – Jason Riley, Hamilton Tiger-Cats
OG – Roger Aldag, Saskatchewan Roughriders
OT – Miles Gorrell, Hamilton Tiger-Cats
OT – Chris Walby, Winnipeg Blue Bombers

Defence
DT – Harold Hallman, Toronto Argonauts
DT – Mike Walker, Hamilton Tiger-Cats
DE – Grover Covington, Hamilton Tiger-Cats
DE – Stewart Hill, Edmonton Eskimos
LB – Danny Bass, Edmonton Eskimos
LB – Eddie Lowe, Saskatchewan Roughriders
LB – James West, Winnipeg Blue Bombers
CB – Stanley Blair, Edmonton Eskimos
CB – Rod Hill, Winnipeg Blue Bombers
DB – Don Wilson, Edmonton Eskimos
DB – Enis Jackson, Edmonton Eskimos
DS – Scott Flagel, Ottawa Rough Riders

Special teams
P – Bob Cameron, Winnipeg Blue Bombers
K – Dave Ridgway, Saskatchewan Roughriders
ST – Anthony Hunter, Edmonton Eskimos

1989 Eastern All-Stars

Offence
QB – Mike Kerrigan, Hamilton Tiger-Cats
RB – Gil Fenerty, Toronto Argonauts
RB – Derrick McAdoo, Hamilton Tiger-Cats
SB – Rocky DiPietro, Hamilton Tiger-Cats
SB – Darrell Smith, Toronto Argonauts
WR – Tony Champion, Hamilton Tiger-Cats
WR – James Murphy, Winnipeg Blue Bombers
C – Dale Sanderson, Hamilton Tiger-Cats
OG – Jason Riley, Hamilton Tiger-Cats
OG – David Black, Winnipeg Blue Bombers
OT – Miles Gorrell, Hamilton Tiger-Cats
OT – Chris Walby, Winnipeg Blue Bombers

Defence
DT – Harold Hallman, Toronto Argonauts
DT – Mike Walker, Hamilton Tiger-Cats
DE – Grover Covington, Hamilton Tiger-Cats
DE – Mike Gray, Winnipeg Blue Bombers
LB – Greg Battle, Winnipeg Blue Bombers
LB – Frank Robinson, Hamilton Tiger-Cats
LB – James West, Hamilton Tiger-Cats
CB – Reggie Pleasant, Toronto Argonauts
CB – Rod Hill, Winnipeg Blue Bombers
DB – Ed Berry, Toronto Argonauts
DB – Stephen Jordan, Hamilton Tiger-Cats
DS – Scott Flagel, Ottawa Rough Riders

Special teams
P – Bob Cameron, Winnipeg Blue Bombers
K – Paul Osbaldiston, Hamilton Tiger-Cats
ST – Wally Zatylny, Hamilton Tiger-Cats

1989 Western All-Stars

Offence
QB – Tracy Ham, Edmonton Eskimos
RB – Tim McCray, Saskatchewan Roughriders
RB – Reggie Taylor, Edmonton Eskimos
SB – Jeff Fairholm, Saskatchewan Roughriders
SB – Craig Ellis, Edmonton Eskimos
WR – David Williams, BC Lions
WR – Don Narcisse, Saskatchewan Roughriders
C – Rod Connop, Edmonton Eskimos
OG – Dan Ferrone, Calgary Stampeders
OG – Roger Aldag, Saskatchewan Roughriders
OT – Blake Dermott, Edmonton Eskimos
OT – Hector Pothier, Edmonton Eskimos

Defence
DT – Brett Williams, Edmonton Eskimos
DT – James Curry, Saskatchewan Roughriders
DE – Bobby Jurasin, Saskatchewan Roughriders
DE – Stewart Hill, Edmonton Eskimos
LB – Danny Bass, Edmonton Eskimos
LB – Eddie Lowe, Saskatchewan Roughriders
LB – Larry Wruck, Edmonton Eskimos
CB – Stanley Blair, Edmonton Eskimos
CB – Andre Francis, Edmonton Eskimos
DB – Don Wilson, Edmonton Eskimos
DB – Enis Jackson, Edmonton Eskimos
DS – Glen Suitor, Saskatchewan Roughriders

Special teams
P – Brent Matich, Calgary Stampeders
K – Dave Ridgway, Saskatchewan Roughriders
ST – Anthony Hunter, Edmonton Eskimos

1989 CFL Awards
CFL's Most Outstanding Player Award – Tracy Ham (QB), Edmonton Eskimos
CFL's Most Outstanding Canadian Award – Rocky DiPietro (SB), Hamilton Tiger-Cats
CFL's Most Outstanding Defensive Player Award – Danny Bass (LB), Edmonton Eskimos
CFL's Most Outstanding Offensive Lineman Award – Rod Connop (C), Edmonton Eskimos
CFL's Most Outstanding Rookie Award – Stephen Jordan (DB), Hamilton Tiger-Cats
CFLPA's Outstanding Community Service Award – Matt Dunigan (QB), BC Lions
CFL's Coach of the Year – John Gregory, Saskatchewan Roughriders

References 

CFL
Canadian Football League seasons